Alfred Kantor (7 November 1923, in Prague – 16 January 2003, in Yarmouth, Maine) was a Czech-born Holocaust survivor, artist and author of The Book of Alfred Kantor. His work depicted daily life in the Nazi concentration camps.

Before Being Sent To Concentration Camps 
Alfred Kantor was expelled in 1941 from the Rottner School of Advertising in Prague after only completing one year of his two-year commercial art program because they had learned of his Jewish Identification.

Theresienstadt Concentration Camp 

Soon after Alfred Kantor had been expelled from the Rottner School of Advertising in Prague in 1941 he was then transported to Theresienstadt Concentration camp, specifically Terezin the ghetto connected to the camp. This camp was made for the public to see that Concentration Camps weren't bad, however thousands still died at this camp. This was only the first stop for Alfred Kantor. In 1944 the Danish Red Cross and International Red cross came to inspect the camp, but they were only touring on previously determined routes. This caused the Nazis to completely change the looks of this camp. They did this by installing new shops and even send out sickly prisoners for healthier ones. After the Red Cross left, they removed everything and went back to normal. This camp had about 140,000 Jews total transferred in, about 90,000 were deported out, and about 33,000 of those Jews died in Theresienstadt.

Kantor sought out any materials he could find after arriving. During his time here he painted and sketched daily life. Kantor even illustrated all of the fake shops set up for the Red Cross visit in 1944. Kantor stated in his book that he wanted to capture the extraordinary experiences in the camps to show them to the world after his liberation instead of documenting his life. Kantor eventually saw he was on a transfer list to Auschwitz and left his art to a close friend in the camp. After the camps were liberated that friend returned them to Kantor.

Auschwitz Concentration Camp 

Alfred Kantor had then been deported to Auschwitz concentration camp. Kantor had a harder time finding supplies to create his art because art was totally prohibited. Kantor was slipped a watercolor set while he was working at the sick ward by a physician, however if he was caught painting he would have been punished or killed. Thus, most art Kantor had produced he destroyed or he hid in a place where Kantor was sure that prison guards wouldn't be able to find it.

Schwarzheide Concentration Camp 
In 1944 Alfred Kantor was relocated to Schwarzheide concentration camp, this camp was a subcamp of the Sachsenhausen, and he was a prisoner who had to help Germany rebuild a synthetic fuel plant. Kantor had realized that while the prisoners wanted to have an allied, however in order to become free after this they had to endure air raids. This meant that they were not allowed to take shelter during these raids, but the German soldiers were. After the war ended Kantor was transported back to Theresienstadt on April 18, 1945, and so were 1,000 other prisoners. Of the 1,000 prisoners only 175 had survived the long march back.

The Book of Alfred Kantor 
In his book, The Book of Alfred Kantor, there are the 127 sketches and paintings most of which he had made while in the three concentration camps he was imprisoned in. The art in the book depicts the history Kantor witnessed like the infamous chief physician, Josef Mengele in his Nazi Uniform. Others in the book were re-creations since not all art was encouraged in the concentration camps. It was first published in 1971 by McGraw-Hill and the second edition was published in 1987 by Schocken Books.

After the War 

At the end of the war Kantor went back to Prague and went on to Deggendorf Displaced Persons Camp in July 1945. In Deggendorf Kantor began creating more art to detail his experience in the war. Kantor then went to the United States in 1947 and was drafted into the Selective Service System in the United States Army. Kantor ended up playing the glockenspiel in the military band. Kantor then finished his schooling and began working in the advertising business in New York.

References 

1923 births
2003 deaths
Artists from Prague
Holocaust survivors
Czechoslovak emigrants to the United States
Czech Jews
Jewish American artists
Czech artists
20th-century American Jews
21st-century American Jews